Polly King Ruhtenberg  (May 18, 1907 – January 23, 1983) was an American children’s book author and libertarian.

Ruhtenberg  grew up in Morristown, New Jersey, and went to the Shipley School in Pennsylvania and Barnard College in New York City.

She married her second husband, Alexander Gustav Jan Ruhtenberg on August 4, 1935.  While in New York  she helped organize the New York City Maternal Health Centres and served as its secretary. In 1940 the couple moved away from New York City to Colorado Springs, Colorado.

For a ten-year span, 1952–1962, Ruhtenberg  served as the Colorado Coordinator for the Vigilante Women for the Bricker Amendment.  During this time period she was also the joint-chairwoman of the Colorado Committee for the Liberty Amendment.  While in Colorado she also served as a member of the National Society of Colonial Dames of America, the Colorado Springs Opera Association, and board member of the Pioneer Museum, and many other civic and social organizations.

She died January 23, 1983, in Colorado Springs, Colorado.

Works 
 Henry McAllister : Colorado pioneer
 The Clock in Broadmarket Square
 Divorce Yourself from Worthless Habits
 Gold Finding for the Weekender, G. A. Huggins, co-author
 Granma's Weather Signs
 Gunpowder
 Know Why I Want You for My Valentine, Sweetheart?
 The long-lost letter, Rosemary Hetzler, co-author
 The Marland Hounds (The Hounds of Marland Road)
 Nip or The Adventures of Nip, Karl T. Pflock, co-author. (Published, 1982)
 Only the White Mare Mourned
 Puppy Dog Tails
 Mrs. Tiggiewinkle
 Twinkle and Tinker
 Up the Down Elevator

References

External links
 

1907 births
1983 deaths
American children's writers
American libertarians
Shipley School alumni